Svarta ballader (Black Ballads) is a 1917 poetry collection by the Swedish proletarian writer Dan Andersson, his third and the last to be published before his early death in 1920. It has become one of the most important texts in 20th century Swedish literature. The poems convey strong feelings about life's struggles, love, hate, suffering, and death. They are framed in nature-romanticism, set in Andersson's wild rural home region of Dalarna. Several have a musician as a central figure, close to Andersson himself, while others evince social sympathy for beggars and outcasts. The core theme, however, is religious, with a combination of Christian longing for eternity and Indian nirvana mysticism.

Many of the poems have been set to music and recorded as songs by 20th century composers and singer-songwriters, including by Andersson, and Sven Scholander. The singer Sofia Karlsson's 2005 album was called Svarta Ballader; it interpreted five poems from the book. The 1972 Hootenanny Singers recording of the first song in the book, "Omkring tiggarn från Luossa", remained on the Swedish charts for an exceptional 52 weeks.

Author 

The book's author was the Swedish proletarian school author Dan Andersson. He was born in a village in the forested Dalarna province, and grew up in poverty; his father was a primary school teacher, taking odd jobs to try to earn enough money to live on. Andersson was sent to Forest Lake, Minnesota when he was 14 to see if the family could move there for a better life. He reported that things were no better there, and returned home. He published three poetry books in his lifetime: Kolarhistorier (Charcoal Stories, 1914), Kolvaktarens visor (The Charcoal-burner's Songs, 1915), and Svarta Ballader (1917). In 1918 he married Olga Turesson, sister to the troubadour . Andersson became well-educated, writing poems and translating texts such as Charles Baudelaire's 1857 Les Fleurs du mal into Swedish. He died aged 32 of accidental poisoning in a hotel in Stockholm in 1920. His wife Olga was pregnant at the time, and in 1921 gave birth to a daughter, Monica (married name Sedell). He was not well-known in his lifetime, becoming famous after his death. By 1970 he was one of Sweden's best-known and most loved poets.

Publication history 

Andersson had such difficulty finding a publisher that he accepted Albert Bonniers Förlag's offer of 25 copies of the book as his sole payment. Bonniers brought out Svarta ballader in Stockholm in 1917. New editions were printed by Zinderman in 1975 and 1992; by Niloe in 1977 and 1981; and by the Sublunar Society in 2018.

Contents 

Svarta ballader contains 28 poems. They describe the life of people outcast from society such as beggars and released prisoners, sailors in a tavern, an old man, and a man on his deathbed. Among the poems are some of his best-known, including "Omkring tiggarn från Luossa" and "En spelmans jordafärd". "En strof till Huck Finns minne" (actually 4 stanzas, not one) expresses a romantic Swedish view of Huckleberry Finn's America.

Reception 

Since Andersson's death, Svarta ballader has become one of the most significant books in 20th century Swedish literature. The book was ranked 87 in a 2012 survey among the audience of the Swedish literary TV series . 

As early as 1922, the author  wrote that Andersson's poems, especially those of Svarta ballader, were the most artistically distinctive of his works, and predicted that the book would be an essential item for scholars of modern literature. 

Per Arne Henricson, in the companion to Swedish literature Berömda svenska böcker: en litterär uppslagsbok (Famous Swedish books: a literary reference book) comments that Andersson is not one of Sweden's greatest poets but has become popular, especially through Svarta ballader. He states that the book's songs (in the visa tradition) have a rhythm and melody that has attracted musical settings, which are often very attractive. In addition, he writes, the poems convey strong, simple feelings about the deepest questions of existence: life's struggles against adversity, love, hate, suffering, and death. He notes that Andersson adds to this a frame of nature-romanticism with a strong wild country mysticism and the Dalarna region's many exotic Finnish names for rivers, lakes, and villages. A central figure in Svarta ballader is the musician, who he notes is close to Andersson, appearing in "Omkring Tiggarn från Luossa", "En spelmans jordafärd", "Spelmannen", and "Karis-Janken." He observes that in other poems, a social sympathy is evident, such as for the beggar Simon and his hungry mother who worked for the rich. But despite all of this, he argues, the strongest theme in the book is religious. In what he considers the best poems in the collection, "Omkring Tiggarn från Luossa" and "Gillet på vinden", a note is struck which combines Christian longing for eternity with Indian nirvana mysticism.

Lena Marklund, on the literary Project Runeberg, wrote that Svarta ballader marked Andersson's transition from the concrete descriptions in his earlier books of poems to the metaphysical. He continued to write poems about the wild countryside ("vildmarkspoesi"), but by focussing on solitary and ragged figures, he was able to use their life struggles in a hard world to provide an answer to metaphysical questions. In her view, he made use of every imaginable effect to express the unsayable, from typography and unfamiliar Finnish placenames to romantic phrases like "the darkest dark" and musical resonances. She gives as example "En spelmans jordafärd" (A musician's last journey), which creates the illusion of a torrent of orchestral music with its contrapuntal structure, rhythm, and ingenious rhymes. However, Marklund states, the deepest feature of Svarta ballader is Andersson's inner determination to free himself from a traditional view of God tied up with sin, grace, and penance.

The author and Swedish Academy member Lotta Lotass writes that the dark poems of Svarta ballader "shimmer with the longing for an elusive beyond". In her view, that longing forms a pervasive thread in Andersson's poetry, which constantly investigates the soul's environment after death, using both Christian and Buddhist symbolism. She has described the first poem in the book, "Omkring tiggarn från Luossa" as the key to the whole of Anderson's work. The poem was set to music, and the 1972 recording by the Hootenanny Singers remained on the Swedish charts for an exceptional 52 weeks. Fogelqvist commented that both the first poem and the last ("Gillet på vinden") spoke of the same unheard song beyond all sound and substance:

Fogelqvist called this typical Andersson with its wonderful string music of the harmony of the spheres.

Use as songs 

Many of the poems have been set to music by 20th century composers and singer-songwriters, including by Andersson, and Sven Scholander, becoming well-known as songs in Sweden. 
Bergman's 1987 album Dan Andersson covered fifteen of Andersson's poems, including seven from Svarta ballader. The singer Sofia Karlsson's 2005 album was called Svarta ballader; it interpreted eleven Andersson poems, but despite the title only five were from the book.

References

Bibliography

External links 

 Svarta ballader on Litteraturbanken
 Full text of Svarta ballader on Wikisource
 Poems by and essays about Dan Andersson on Projekt Runeberg

1917 poetry books
Dan Andersson